The Johnson County Courthouse is located at 215 W. Main Street in downtown Clarksville, the county seat of Johnson County, Arkansas.  It is a three-story masonry structure, built out of brick and rusticated concrete blocks.  It has a Classical Revival facade, with a seven-bay projecting section.  Windows and entrances on the ground floor are set in round-arch openings, while the upper-level windows are rectangular sash, set in bays articulated by pilasters.  It was built in 1934 with funding support from the Federal Emergency Administration, and is the county's third courthouse.

The building was listed on the National Register of Historic Places in 1991.

See also
National Register of Historic Places listings in Johnson County, Arkansas

References

External links

Courthouses on the National Register of Historic Places in Arkansas
National Register of Historic Places in Johnson County, Arkansas
Colonial Revival architecture in Arkansas
Neoclassical architecture in Arkansas
Buildings and structures in Johnson County, Arkansas